Onekawa is a suburb of the city of Napier, in the Hawke's Bay Region of the eastern North Island of New Zealand. Development of the suburb began in the late 1940s, after the land was acquired from then-Harbour Board.

The New Zealand Ministry for Culture and Heritage gives a translation of "salty soil" for Onekawa.

Onekawa houses a high proportion of industry trade businesses.

Demographics

Onekawa had a population of 6,588 at the 2018 New Zealand census, an increase of 642 people (10.8%) since the 2013 census, and an increase of 834 people (14.5%) since the 2006 census. There were 2,364 households, comprising 3,201 males and 3,387 females, giving a sex ratio of 0.95 males per female, with 1,596 people (24.2%) aged under 15 years, 1,320 (20.0%) aged 15 to 29, 2,640 (40.1%) aged 30 to 64, and 1,029 (15.6%) aged 65 or older.

Ethnicities were 70.0% European/Pākehā, 34.9% Māori, 6.0% Pacific peoples, 5.2% Asian, and 2.1% other ethnicities. People may identify with more than one ethnicity.

The percentage of people born overseas was 13.8, compared with 27.1% nationally.

Although some people chose not to answer the census's question about religious affiliation, 52.1% had no religion, 32.0% were Christian, 5.3% had Māori religious beliefs, 0.8% were Hindu, 0.4% were Muslim, 0.6% were Buddhist and 1.9% had other religions.

Of those at least 15 years old, 552 (11.1%) people had a bachelor's or higher degree, and 1,233 (24.7%) people had no formal qualifications. 381 people (7.6%) earned over $70,000 compared to 17.2% nationally. The employment status of those at least 15 was that 2,295 (46.0%) people were employed full-time, 684 (13.7%) were part-time, and 261 (5.2%) were unemployed.

Marae
The local Pukemokimoki marae is a marae (meeting ground) for the iwi (tribe) of Ngāti Kahungunu and its hapū (sub-tribe) of Ngā Hau E Whā, and includes the wharenui (meeting house) of Omio.

Education

Hawke's Bay School for Teenage Parents is a teenage parenting facility within the college.

All these schools are co-educational. Rolls are as of

References

Suburbs of Napier, New Zealand